The Hangin' Tough Tour was a concert tour of the boy band New Kids on the Block, launched to support their album Hangin' Tough.

Background
Since the 1988 release of Hangin' Tough, the New Kids had performed as the opening act for fellow teen pop singer Tiffany's successful North American tour. Due to a sudden rise of the group's popularity, Tiffany wound up opening for them on this tour, but they were credited as co-headliners.

Recordings
The group's June 5 concert at the Mayan Theater was filmed and released as Hangin' Tough- Live. The Home video was certified 12× platinum by RIAA for selling over 1.2 million copies in United States.

Setlist
 Be My Girl
 My Favorite Girl
 What'cha Gonna Do (About It)
 Please Don't Go Girl
 Cover Girl
 You Got It (The Right Stuff)
 I'll Be Loving You (Forever)
 Hangin' Tough
 This One's for the Children

Tour dates

Opening acts
 Tiffany (select dates)
 Tommy Page (select dates)

References

1989 concert tours
New Kids on the Block concert tours